Anisur Rahman is a masculine Muslim given name, meaning companion of the Most Merciful.
Notable bearers of the name include:

Aneesur Rahman (1927–1987), Indian physicist
Anisur Rahman Anis (c. 1940–2019), Bangladeshi film, television and theatre actor
Anisur Rahman (politician) (b. 1952), Indian politician in West Bengal
Anis-ur-Rehman (born 1970), Pakistani cricketer
Anisur Rahman (cricketer) (born 1971), Bangladeshi cricketer and umpire
Anisur Rahman Milon (born 1974), better known as Milon, Bangladeshi actor
Aneesh Raman (born  1980), American journalist
Anisur Rahman (Bangladeshi politician), of the Jatiya Party (Ershad)

Arabic masculine given names